Kriakivka is a village in Shchastia Raion (district) in Luhansk Oblast of eastern Ukraine, at about 45 km NW from the centre of Luhansk.

Demographics
In 2001 the settlement had 470 inhabitants. Native language as of the Ukrainian Census of 2001:
Ukrainian — 17.02%
 Russian — 82.34%
 others — 0.64%

References

Villages in Shchastia Raion
Shchastia Raion
Populated places established in 1674